Frédéric François (born 25 January 1977) is an alpine skier who won a silver and bronze medal for France at the 2018 Winter Paralympics.

References

External links 
 
 

1977 births
Living people
French male alpine skiers
French disabled sportspeople
Paralympic alpine skiers of France
Paralympic silver medalists for France
Paralympic bronze medalists for France
Alpine skiers at the 2018 Winter Paralympics
Medalists at the 2018 Winter Paralympics
Paralympic medalists in alpine skiing
21st-century French people